Zadonsky District is an administrative and municipal district (raion), one of the eighteen in Lipetsk Oblast, Russia. It is located in the southern central part of the oblast. Its administrative center is the town of Zadonsk. Population:  37,244 (2002 Census);  The population of Zadonsk accounts for 28.7% of the district's total population.

References

Notes

Sources

Districts of Lipetsk Oblast